is an English contract law case concerning misrepresentation.

Facts
Chase Manhattan Bank was in the highly speculative business of lending money against receipts from five future movies (in this case, Amy Foster, U Turn, Apt Pupil, The Mirror Has Two Faces and The People vs. Larry Flynt). The bank wanted to protect against its substantial risk. So it took out a policy of insurance with HIH Insurance. Intermediaries who knew about movies, much more than either the bank or the insurer, negotiated. The bank made a claim for insurance cover. HIH resisted the bank's claim and in doing so alleged misrepresentations, both negligent and fraudulent, by the bank’s agents (not the bank itself). The insurance contract contained disclaimers for misrepresentations by the bank. One issue was whether the disclaimers could absolve the bank of liability for misrepresentation.

Judgment
All of the judges except Lord Steyn gave a speech. The majority of the House of Lords (Lord Bingham, Lord Steyn, Lord Hoffmann, Lord Hobhouse) held the disclaimers could exclude liability for negligent misrepresentation, but not for fraud, were it established. One could exclude liability for someone else's fraud, but not for one's own. They said that to try to exclude liability for one's own fraud would be contrary to public policy.

Lord Bingham said:

Lord Scott dissented.

In the case of Biffa Waste Services v MEH (2008), Lord Ramsey observed that the guidelines established in Canada Steamship Lines v The King had been emphasised by Bingham to be "helpful guidance on the proper approach to interpretation and not laying down a code ...".

See also

English contract law
Misrepresentation in English law
JPMorgan Chase Bank v. Traffic Stream (BVI) Infrastructure Ltd.

References

English misrepresentation case law
House of Lords cases
2003 in case law
2003 in British law
JPMorgan Chase